Kastamonu Eyalet was an eyalet of the Ottoman Empire.

Administrative divisions
Sanjaks of the Eyalet in the mid-19th century:
 Sanjak of Kocaeli (Bithynia)
 Sanjak of Bolu (Paphlagonia)
 Sanjak of Virantsehir (Honorias) (near Eskipazar?)
 Sanjak of Sinope (Helenopontus)

References

Kastamonu
1827 establishments in the Ottoman Empire
1864 disestablishments in the Ottoman Empire